Grand Gedeh-3 is an electoral district for the elections to the House of Representatives of Liberia. The constituency covers B'hai District, Gbao District, Gboe-Ploe District and Cavalla District (except the Lower Gorbo community).

Elected representatives

References

Electoral districts in Liberia